Thomas Todd (1765–1826) was a justice of the United States Supreme Court, 1807–1826.

Thomas, Tom or Tommy Todd may also refer to:

Thomas Todd (piper) (c. 1832–1903), player of the Northumbrian smallpipes
Tommy Todd (1926–2014), Scottish footballer
Thomas Wingate Todd (1885–1938), English orthodontist
Thomas H. Todd III, United States Army general
SS Thomas Todd, a Liberty ship